The 2003 Southern Conference men's basketball tournament took place from March 5–8, 2003 at the North Charleston Coliseum in North Charleston, South Carolina. The East Tennessee State Buccaneers defeated their in-state rival Chattanooga in the championship game to win their fifth title in school history and receive the automatic berth to the 2003 NCAA tournament. Tim Smith of ETSU was named the tournament's Most Valuable Player.

Format
All twelve teams were eligible for the tournament. The tournament used a preset bracket consisting of four rounds, the first of which featured four games, with the winners moving on to the quarterfinal round. The top two finishers in each division received first round byes.

Bracket

* Overtime game

See also
List of Southern Conference men's basketball champions

References

Tournament
Southern Conference men's basketball tournament
Southern Conference men's basketball tournament
Southern Conference men's basketball tournament